The 1917 Akron football team represented the University of Akron, formerly Buchtel College, in the 1917 college football season. The team was led by head coach Fred Sefton, in his third season. For the first time since the 1912 season, Akron outscored their opponents, by a total of 143-84.

Schedule

References

Akron
Akron Zips football seasons
Akron football